Rotsund or Rotsundelv is a village in Nordreisa Municipality in Troms og Finnmark county, Norway. The village is located along the Rotsundet strait, across from the island of Uløya. Rotsund Chapel is located in this village. On the western end of the village, there is a ferry port with regular ferry service to Hamnes and Klauvnes on the island of Uløya.

References

Villages in Troms
Nordreisa